Robert Frier RSA (1855–1912) was a Scottish artist. He specialised in landscapes.

Life
He was born in Edinburgh in 1855. His father also Robert was a draper with a shop on the Lawnmarket in the Old Town and living at Ratcliffe Terrace in the South Side. As there is a Robert Frier exhibiting at the Royal Scottish Academy from 1853 this may indicate that his father also had artistic talent. His older brother Henry (Harry) Frier (1849-1921) was also an artist.

In 1880 he was living in a flat at 62 Queen Street, Edinburgh.

By 1890 he is living in a much larger house at 108 George Street and is listed as a "landscape artist and teacher of drawing and painting".

By 1895 he has left Edinburgh, possibly to live with his brother Henry in London.

Known Works

Stormy Highland Scene with Fishermen
Scottish Landscape with Stick Gatherer
Boat on a Canal with Trees
Two Figures on a Bridge
Scottish River Scene
On the Lochside near Luss
In the Leny Glen

References

1855 births
1918 deaths
Artists from Edinburgh
Scottish artists